Annie Lowe (1834–1910) was a suffragist in Victoria, Australia. She and Henrietta Dugdale founded the Victorian Women's Suffrage Society (the suffragettes) in 1884, the first organisation of this kind to be established in Australia.

Biography
Lowe née Hopkins was born in 1834. Her father was involved with establishing universal suffrage for men in New South Wales. She moved to Victoria with her husband Josiah Alexander Lowe.  In 1884 she helped found the Victorian Women's Suffrage Society. She was known for her public speaking. She lived to see the women of Victoria given the right to vote in 1908, but died before being able to vote in the 1911 state election.

Upon her death The Herald newspaper reported that in Lowe 'will be written in our history as the mother of our suffrage movement'.

References

1834 births
1910 deaths
Australian suffragists